Donald Clayton Scott (July 30, 1927 – November 3, 2005) was a Canadian football player who played for the Toronto Argonauts. He won the Grey Cup with them in 1950. He previously played football at and attended the University of Western Ontario. After his football career he was president of the Ontario Insurance Commission and CEO of Ernst Young. He died of cancer in 2005.

References

1927 births
Sportspeople from Windsor, Ontario
Players of Canadian football from Ontario
Toronto Argonauts players
2005 deaths